Putuidem (Acjachemen: "belly" or "the navel"), alternative spelling Putiidhem or Putuidhem, was a large native village of the Acjachemen people, also known as Juaneño since their relocation to Mission San Juan Capistrano. The site was a mother village, the primary settlement of the tribe that spawned other villages. 

It was situated in what is currently San Juan Capistrano, California just off Interstate 5, about a mile north of the mission. It is now buried underneath the sports field and performing arts center of Junipero Serra Catholic High School, which began construction with approval from the city in 2003 after many attempts to preserve the site. 

In 2021, the Putuidem Village Park was opened in the city to commemorate the village.

History

Indigenous 
The village sat at the site of a spring, and was founded by Chief Oyaison, also spelled Oyison, who left Sejat after an extreme drought, and his daughter Coronne. In a story of the village, Coronne led a migration to a spring, near the confluence of Oso Creek and Trabuco Creek. Coronne died suddenly and her body became a mound of earth. The grieving people returned to Putuidem and slept in a pyramid shape, referred to as acjachema, which gave the Acjachemen their name. Coronne, who had a lump at her navel, gave the village its name.

In one source citing Gerónimo Boscana, it is stated that the village "was later ruled by a relative called Choqual who also ruled Atoum-pumcaxque" (the nearby village of Acjacheme). Putuidem was located upstream from the coastal village of Toovunga and downstream from the villages of Alume (via Trabuco Creek), Sajavit (via San Juan Creek), Piwiva (via San Juan Creek), and Huumai (via San Juan Creek).

Mission period 
In 1776, Mission San Juan Capistrano was constructed adjacent to Putuidem as well as the nearby village of Ahachmai, which significantly affected the village, depleting its population to serve the mission. The village soon became depleted with the increased arrival of Europeans. At the same time, the mission expanded and grew, with 383 converts by 1783, many of which were likely from Putuidem, and 741 converts by 1790.

Recent converts or neophytes did the vast majority of labor on the mission, taking care of the herds and grain crops. After nine years of construction, a stone church at the mission was completed in 1806, with a high tower and five interior arches of stone "all the work of the neophytes." By 1810, there were 1,138 neophytes, peaking at 1,361 in 1812, and declining thereafter. The stone church was destroyed in the 1812 San Juan Capistrano earthquake, which killed nearly 50 native people who were attending mass. After the secularization of the mission in 1833, a total of 4,317 natives had been baptized at the mission, 1,689 of whom were adults and 2,628 of whom were children. The number of deaths at the mission was 3,158. Many of the people who survived the mission period settled in the surrounding areas.

American occupation 
In 1933, it was noted that the nearby Putuidem spring, referred to by the Spanish as El Aguagito or El Aguajito could be found 0.8 miles north of Highway 101 at a spot where an old Sycamore tree stood. The land was owned by Aaron Buchheim in 1933, whose descendant sold it to Junipero Serra High School. Approximately five hundred descendants of the villagers continued to live in the San Juan Capistrano area.

Evidence of ceremonial burials and cremations, sacred artifacts, golden eagle and condor bone fragments, which have been linked to and are sacred to Chinigchinich, were found in the soil around the village site. Archaeologists estimated that two hundred burials occurred around Putuidem, with sites thousands of years older being located closer to the sacred spring of the village.

Burial under Junipero Serra Catholic High School 
The construction of Junipero Serra Catholic High School disrupted and buried the site when construction began in 2003. Various members of the community sued the city to stop construction, but the city went forward with construction. The village was buried by the gymnasium, athletic fields, and performing arts complex of JSerra Catholic High School. The construction of this complex was unsuccessfully blocked by the Acjachemen, who protested after human remains were discovered at the site, thus giving it cultural value. 

The two larger groups of the Acjachemen opposed development, while the leader of one small faction approved of the development. The leader of this faction gained consulting fees for the project and was designated as the MLD (most likely descendant) for the project, which is a requirement under California state law. It was noted that he had lost many battles against development for years, and had given up on opposing development. The person who initiated development of the site was reportedly the owner of a Toyota dealership in Laguna Niguel. Rumors of it being a tax shelter spread during the process. There were concerns that additional artifacts and ancestor remains were unearthed during the construction process and buried in a location only known to the pro-development leader.

At one of the legal hearings for the development, some supporters of the development questioned "How can a vacant lot be sacred?" while other supporters insisted that "They should just go to church." One man stated "it's not sacred... or if it is, then all the land around here is sacred!" An Acjachemen woman in her fifties replied, "Yes, all the land around here is sacred. But some places are more sacred than others." The Acjachemen people who opposed development protested and organized to stop construction prior to and during its construction. Other Indigenous peoples of California, including the Tongva, MeXica (Mexican Indigenous activists) and pro-Aztlán activists from Santa Ana, as well as low-income Mexican immigrants from nearby cities came to oppose development. 

Critics of the development have noted that the high school is named after Junípero Serra, the founder of the same local mission that originally displaced the residents of the Putuidem village. Other critics have called the development an extension of America's removal of Indigenous people and an erasure of Acjachemen culture. The high school itself has addressed the history of the site in their student newspaper, The Paw Print. Custodians of the high school made claims of paranormal activity at the complex.

Putuidem Village Park 
In 2015, the Acjachemen and city of San Juan Capistrano began working toward constructing a 1.3 acre park north of the high school. The park was to feature a statue of Coronne, a small amphitheater, traditional style buildings, interpretative displays, and a cultural center. However, in 2019, there were concerns if the park was to ever be constructed. In late 2021, the park was opened after many delays and is listed as The Village of Putuidem.

The Northwest Open Space, in which the village park is located, continues to be eyed for additional development, despite opposition. The 65 acre space was originally bought by the city in the 1990s with money raised "by the sale of bonds approved by voters with the purpose of acquiring more open space."

See also 
Indigenous peoples of California
California mission clash of cultures
Native American villages in Orange County, California:

 Acjacheme
 Ahunx
 Alauna
 Genga
 Hutuknga
 Lupukngna
 Moyongna
 Pajbenga
 Puhú
 Piwiva
 Totpavit

References

California Mission Indians
Former Native American populated places in California
Juaneño populated places
San Juan Capistrano, California
History of Orange County, California
Acjachemen